The Singapore national cricket team is the team that represents Singapore in international cricket. Singapore has been an associate member of the International Cricket Council (ICC) since 1974, and was a founding member of the Asian Cricket Council formed in 1983.

The Singapore Cricket Club was established in 1837 during the colonial period. Singapore played regular fixtures against other British colonies in Asia beginning in the late 19th century, notably participating in the interport matches. It later contributed players to combined teams representing the Straits Settlements and Malaya. After gaining ICC membership, Singapore played in six out of the first seven editions of the ICC Trophy, beginning in 1979. Post-independence, its greatest rivalry is with neighbouring Malaysia, in the annual Stan Nagaiah Trophy. Singapore reached as high as Division Three of the World Cricket League. The team made its Twenty20 International debut in 2019, following the granting of that status to associate members of the ICC, and in the same year participated in the ICC Men's T20 World Cup Qualifier for the first time.

History

Beginnings of cricket in Singapore

The first recorded mention of cricket in Singapore was in 1837 when a "Mr Z" complained, in a letter to the Singapore Free Press, of cricket being played near a church on a Sunday in violation of the Christian Sabbath. This resulted in cricket being banned on Sundays, a prohibition that remained in place until the 1930s.

Cricket was an important recreational activity, with matches often played against the officers of visiting ships. The Singapore Cricket Club was formed in 1852 and played its first match amongst themselves the same year. The quality of cricket in these early years was quite poor, and it wasn't until 1865 before a team total of more than 100 was scored. Louis Glass became the first person in Singapore to record a century two years later.

The Singapore Cricket Club eventually began to play against teams from other parts of British Malaya such as Penang, Perak and Kuala Lumpur and this eventually led to an invitation from Hong Kong to send a team there, which saw the beginning of the long-running series of "Interport matches".

Straits Settlements cricket team

The 1890 invitation from Hong Kong led to the formation of the Straits Settlements cricket team, and they played Hong Kong in two two-day matches, both of which were lost. The series was the beginning of the "Interport Matches", which continued until 1987. Hong Kong and Ceylon came to Singapore the following year, and the Straits Settlements won both matches, also drawing against a combined Ceylon/Hong Kong team.

The Straits Settlements team beat Ceylon in Colombo in 1893, and played a match in Jakarta in 1895. Matches against the Federated Malay States began in 1896, and against Shanghai in 1897.

They played Burma in 1906, and their involvement in the Interport Matches ceased in 1909, when they were replaced by an All Malaya team. The Straits Settlements visited Bangkok in 1910, though from them their only matches came annually against the Federated Malay States until 1940. These fixtures continue in the modern era as the Saudara Cup matches between Singapore and Malaysia.

Singapore team

First matches

The Singapore team did play twice during the Straits Settlements team era, playing twice against WAS Oldfield's XI in 1927, losing both matches by an innings. They next played in 1957, drawing at home to Ceylon. Various teams visited Singapore in the 1960s, including Worcestershire.

The Interport Matches resumed in 1968 with Singapore drawing against Hong Kong. These matches were played occasionally until 1987. In 1970, the Saudara Cup match against Malaysia was played for the first time, this continues annually to the present day. Also that year, Singapore played an MCC side captain by Tony Lewis and featuring Geoff Boycott. The match was won by the MCC.

ICC membership

Singapore became an associate member of the ICC in 1974 and three years later won the Saudara Cup for the first time. In 1978, Singapore played India at home, the match ending in a draw. Singapore took part in the first ICC Trophy in England in 1979 but could only finish fourth in their first round group after only beating Argentina. They finished fourth out of eight teams in their first round group in the 1982 tournament and withdrew from the 1986 tournament when several of their players couldn't get leave from work.

Singapore played in the South East Asian Tournament for the first time in 1984, playing in the event again in 1988 and 1992 (when they hosted), though they never reached the final as Bangladesh and Hong Kong finished first and second on each occasion. The final Interport Match took place in Singapore in 1987, with Hong Kong beating the home side. They returned to the ICC Trophy for the 1990 tournament in the Netherlands, beating Malaysia and Israel during the event, and failing to progress past the first round.

Singapore began playing in the Tuanku Ja'afar Cup in 1991, an annual tournament against Malaysia, Hong Kong and Thailand. They won the event just once, in 1994, a year in which they finished 19th out of 20 teams in the ICC Trophy. The Stan Nagaiah Trophy, an annual three match series of one-day matches against Malaysia, began the following year. Singapore played in the first ACC Trophy in 1996, beating the Maldives and Thailand but failing to go past the first round. They finished 14th in the 1997 ICC Trophy and could only beat Papua New Guinea in the 1998 ACC Trophy, again failing to go past the first round.

21st century

2000 - 2017

The first two major tournaments of the 21st century for Singapore got them off to a bad start as they lost all their first round matches in both the 2000 ACC Trophy in the UAE and the 2001 ICC Trophy in Ontario, their final ICC Trophy to date. They hosted the ACC Trophy in 2002, beating the Maldives and Thailand (by 325 runs) but again failing to progress beyond the first round, a performance they repeated in 2004. The finished fourth in the ACC Fast Track Countries Tournament in 2004 and 2005.

Singapore began to show an improvement in their form in 2006. That year they finished third in the ACC Premier League and finally passed the first round stage in the ACC Trophy, finishing fifth to qualify for Division Five of the World Cricket League in 2008. They didn't progress beyond the first round of the 2007 ACC Twenty20 Cup, beating only Hong Kong and Saudi Arabia, but captain Chaminda Ruwan did make the highest score of the tournament. In the World Cricket League Division Five tournament in Jersey, Singapore finished fifth after beating Botswana in a play-off, though they did beat Afghanistan during the first round, who went on to win the tournament.

In August 2009, Singapore hosted and won Division Six of the World Cricket League, going through the tournament undefeated and winning promotion back to Division Five. In November 2009, Singapore travelled to the UAE for the 2009 ACC Twenty20 Cup. During the tournament Singapore finished third in Group A, therefore failing to progress to the semi-finals and a chance to qualify for the 2010 Asian Games. In the fifth place playoff Singapore lost to Nepal by 9 wickets to finish to tournament in sixth place.

In the 2010 ICC World Cricket League Division Five, they finished fourth to remain in Division Five. Hosting the 2012 tournament, they ran out winners, moving them up to Division Four and keeping their hopes of World Cup qualification alive. Singapore has decided to dedicate their strengths in to their SEA GAMES team, where Mohammad Yusof Bin Aslam (Captain) has chosen not to participate due to conflict of interest.

In August 2017, Singapore won two medals in cricket at the 2017 Southeast Asian Games. They won the gold medal in the 20-over tournament and the silver medal in the 50-over tournament. On 26 April 2018, ICC released in a press conference that all the men's T20 matches will get T20I status starting from 1 January 2019.

2018-Present
In April 2018, the ICC decided to grant full Twenty20 International (T20I) status to all its members. Therefore, all Twenty20 matches played between Singapore and other ICC members after 1 January 2019 will be a full T20I.

Singapore played their first T20I against Qatar on 22 July 2019.
On 28 July 2019, after their victory against Nepal in the regional finals of the 2018–19 ICC T20 World Cup Asia Qualifier; Singapore qualified for the ICC T20 World Cup Qualifier for the first time.

After April 2019, Singapore will play in the 2019–21 ICC Cricket World Cup Challenge League.

In September 2019, Singapore beat Zimbabwe by four runs in the third T20I match of the 2019–20 Singapore Tri-Nation Series. It was the first time that Singapore had beaten a Full Member team in an international cricket match.

Grounds

Tournament history

World Cricket League

2008 Division Five: 5th place
2009 Division Six: Champions
2010 Division Five: 4th place
2012 Division Five: Champions
2012 Division Four: 3rd place
2014 Division Four: 2nd place
2014 Division Three: 3rd place
2017 Division Three: 3rd place
2018 Division Three: 3rd place (Relegated)

ICC Cricket World Cup Challenge League
2019: 2nd place (League A)

ICC World Cup Qualifier

1979: First round
1982: First round
1986: Withdrew
1990: First round
1994: 19th place
1997: 14th place
2001: First round
2005: Did not qualify
2009: Did not qualify
2014: Did not qualify
2018: Did not qualify

ICC T20 World Cup Qualifier

2008: Did not qualify
2010: Did not qualify
2012: Did not qualify
2015: Did not qualify
2019: 11th place
2022: 8th place

ACC Fast Track Countries Tournament

2004: 4th place
2005: 4th place
2006: 3rd place

ACC Trophy

1996: First round
1998: First round
2000: First round
2002: First round
2004: First round
2006: 5th place
2008 Elite: 5th place
2010 Elite: 9th place

ACC Premier League
2014 Ellite League: Winner

ACC Twenty20 Cup

2007: First round
2009: 6th place
2011: Did not participate
2013: 9th place
2015: 4th place

Asian Games

2010: Withdrew
2014: Did not participate

ACC Eastern Region T20
 2018: Did not participate
 2020: Winner (Qualified for 2020 Asia Cup Qualifier)

Asia Cup Qualifier 
2018: 6th place
2020: Qualified

Records and statistics
International Match Summary — Singapore
 
Last updated 23 December 2022

Twenty20 International 
 Highest team total: 239/3 v. Malaysia on 3 March 2020 at Terdthai Cricket Ground, Bangkok.  
 Highest individual score: 100, Surendran Chandramohan v. Papua New Guinea on 3 July 2022 at Indian Association Ground, Singapore.
 Best individual bowling figures: 4/25, Selladore Vijayakumar v. Nepal on 28 July 2019 at Indian Association Ground, Singapore.

Most T20I runs for Singapore

Most T20I wickets for Singapore

T20I record versus other nations

Records complete to T20I #1980. Last updated 23 December 2022.

Other records and statistics

Twenty20 Matches 
Statistics from Singapore players in World Cricket League matches and ACC Events since 2008

Highest scores

Arjun Mutreja - 108 vs Bermuda at Selangor Turf Club, Kuala Lumpur on 27 October 2014
Christopher Janik – 106 vs Malaysia at Kinrara Academy Oval, Kuala Lumpur on 4 September 2012
Buddhika Mendis – 103* vs Bahrain at The Padang, Singapore on 1 September 2009
Arjun Mutreja - 101* vs United States of America at Kampala, Uganda on 26 May 2017
Rezza Gaznavi – 96 vs Bhutan at The Padang, Singapore on 10 June 2014

Best Bowling figures

 Mulewa Dharmichand – 6/55 vs Guernsey at The Padang, Singapore on 29 August 2009
 Christopher Janik – 5/9 vs Afghanistan at FB Fields, St Clement on 27 May 2008
 Abhiraj Singh – 5/12 vs Tanzania at Selangor Turf Club, Kuala Lumpur on 7 September 2012
 Abhiraj Singh – 5/42 vs Kuwait at Kallang Ground, Singapore on 8 June 2014
 Mohammad Ali – 5/45 vs Hong Kong at Royal Military College, Kuala Lumpur on 30 July 2008
 Chaminda Ruwan – 5/46 vs Qatar at Bayuemas Oval, Kuala Lumpur on 25 July 2008

ICC Trophy

Highest team total: 231/6 v Gibraltar, 25 February 1994 at Ruaraka Sports Club Ground, Nairobi
Highest individual score: 77 by Joshua Dearing v Canada, 28 June 2001 at Toronto Cricket, Skating and Curling Club
Best innings bowling: 5/39 by M. Rajalingam v Fiji, 5 July 1982 at Solihull Cricket Club Ground

Overall

Highest team total: 440/2 v Thailand, 16 July 2002 at Kallang Ground, Singapore
Highest individual score: 191 by K Mendis v Thailand, 16 July 2002 at Kallang Ground, Singapore
Best innings bowling: 8/8 by Mahesh Mehta v Malaysia, 14 September 1979 at The Padang, Malaysia

Current squad

This lists all the active players who have played for the Singapore in the past 12 months (since 23 December 2021) and the forms in which they have played, or any players who have been selected in the team's most recent List A or T20 squad. Updated as on 23 December 2022

Key

Coaching Staff

See also
 List of Singapore Twenty20 International cricketers
 Singapore women's national cricket team

References

External links
 Singapore Cricket Association official website

Cricket in Singapore
National cricket teams
Cricket
Singapore in international cricket